Niš Eyalet was an administrative territorial entity of the Ottoman Empire located in the territory of present-day southern Serbia and western Bulgaria. It was formed in 1846 and its administrative centre was Niš. Pashaluk of Niš was incorporated into Danube Vilayet in 1864.

History

In 1861, Midhat Pasha was put in charge of the Niš Eyalet. He was a reformer influenced by Western ideas and the eyalet became a showpiece of the reformist movement. He tackled the problems of communications and security: he set up a system of block-houses to stop the incursion of armed bands from Serbia. According to his laudatory son's biography of him, "he organized a gendarmerie, secured the peaceful collection of taxes, and put an end to all religious persecution."

He also established schools and hospitals for members of all religious groups without discrimination. Midhat's reforms were so successful that they inspired a reworking of the Ottoman system. In 1864, the council of state decided that the eyalets would be replaced by larger vilayets. At each of these main levels of rule, there would be mixed Muslim-Christian councils.

The first of the vilayets was run for a time by Midhat Pasha and it included the former Niš Eyalet and much of Bulgaria and was called the "Danube Vilayet." In the next three years, he carried through a large program of school-building and other public works, as well as introducing a provincial newspaper.

Administrative divisions
Sanjaks of the Eyalet in the mid-19th century:
 Sanjak of Niš (seat)
 Sanjak of Sofia
 Sanjak of Samokov
 Sanjak of Kyustendil

See also
History of Serbia
History of Bulgaria

References

History of Niš
Ottoman period in the history of Bulgaria
Eyalets of the Ottoman Empire in Europe
States and territories established in 1846
Ottoman Serbia
1846 establishments in the Ottoman Empire
1864 disestablishments in the Ottoman Empire